Jose Roberto Pulido Jr. (born April 25, 1971), known professionally as Bobby Pulido, is an American singer, songwriter, guitarist, and actor. He is credited for introducing Tejano music to a youthful crowd and became a teen idol and one of the most influential Tejano recording artists among Mexican American teenagers.

Pulido debuted on the music scene in 1995 as the lead vocalist of his eponymous band. That same year he signed a recording contract with EMI Latin and released his debut album, Desvelado. The album peaked at number nine on the United States Billboard Top Latin Albums chart and at number three on the U.S. Billboard Regional Mexican Albums chart. It was certified platinum by the Recording Industry Association of America (RIAA), for shipments of 100,000 units. The title track of Desvelado launched Pulido as a popular Tejano musician, but he was criticized by veteran musicians, who believed he was successful in the genre because of his father Roberto Pulido's established music career.

Enséñame (1996), which peaked at number two on the Billboard Regional Mexican Albums chart, earned Pulido a nomination for the Tejano Music Award for Male Entertainer of the Year and the Lo Nuestro Award for Regional Mexican New Artist of the Year. In 1998, he performed to a sold-out Auditorio Coca-Cola in Monterrey, becoming the first Tejano musician to do so. He also became the youngest recipient to be awarded the Orgullo de la Frontera by the Fiestas Mexicanas in February 1999. By 2000, the popularity of Tejano music was declining, resulting in Pulido's subsequent albums to not chart anywhere. Despite this, in 1998 he won Male Entertainer of the Year, which he won three consecutive times.

In 2003, Pulido made his acting debut by starring in the made-for-television film La Decada Furiosa. He also appeared in the telenovelas Fuego en La Sangre and Qué pobres tan ricos. His album Enfermo de Amor (2007) was commercially unsuccessful, and he took a three-year hiatus. Pulido returned to music in March 2010 and released an album titled Dias de Ayer; he also returned to acting and guest-starred in the film Noches Con Platanito. Aside from music and film, Pulido married Eliza Anzaldua in July 1996. Pulido filed for divorce in September 2013, after having fathered three sons with Anzaldua.

Life and career

1971–94: Early life and career beginnings 
Jose Roberto Pulido Jr. was born on April 25, 1971, in Edinburg, Texas.  He is the oldest child of Roberto Pulido, an award-winning Tejano music singer; and Diana Montez, daughter of Norteño musician Mario Montez of Los Donneños. Known as Bobby Pulido, he attended Edinburg High School and joined the school's mariachi group before joining his father's band Los Clásicos as their saxophonist and backup vocalist. In 1994, EMI Latin released a compilation album titled Branding Icons, which featured Pulido with his father on the song "Contigo". Pulido was accepted at St. Mary's University, where he studied business management as his major. After the album's release in 1994, he decided to leave college and pursue a singing career in the Tejano market, during what is now known as the genre's golden age.

1995–99: Debut album and commercial success 
Pulido started his own band with guitarist Gilbert Trejo, bassist Mike Fox, drummer and uncle Jimmy Montez, keyboardist Rey Gutierrez, and Frank Caballero serving as the band's accordionist. Initially, Pulido received criticism from veteran Tejano musicians, who believed the singer was "riding on the hard-earned reputation" of his father's established music career. In May 1995, Pulido signed a recording contract with EMI Latin and released his debut album Desvelado that September. Then-president of EMI Latin Jose Behar told Billboard the company had "high hopes" for the singer in the country music market. His debut single "No Se Por Que" peaked at number 33 on the United States Billboard Hot Latin Tracks chart in December 1995. Desvelado debuted at number 44 on the U.S. Billboard Top Latin Albums chart, the title track was second single released and debuted at number 21 on the U.S. Billboard Hot Latin Tracks chart in the week of February 3, 1996, and Pulido became a popular Tejano recording artist. In April 1996, the album peaked at number nine on the Top Latin Albums chart and number three on the U.S. Billboard Regional Mexican Albums chart. John Lannert of Billboard magazine called Pulido's chart position "impressive" and called the singer a "fast-rising artist". It was certified platinum by the Recording Industry Association of America (RIAA) the same year, signifying shipments of 100,000 units in the U.S.  Pulido ended 1996 as the eighth best-selling regional Mexican artist and Desvelado ended the year as the eleventh best-selling regional Mexican album. The album reached sales of 100,000 units by the end of 1999. At the 1996 Tejano Music Awards, Pulido tied first place with Eddie Gonzales for Best New Rising Male Tejano Artists.

In July 1996, Pulido married Eliza Anzaldua and took a short career hiatus. He continued promoting his second studio album Enséñame, which was released a month after his marriage. Billboard called Enséñame a "rousing" ranchera and "infectious" cumbia-flavored recording, and said it believed Pulido was aiming to follow Emilio Navaira, who wanted to crossover and become a country music artist. Ramiro Burr of the San Antonio Express-News said Pulido's vocals were "much improved" over his previous work. Enséñame peaked at number ten on the U.S. Billboard Top Latin Albums and number two on the U.S. Billboard Regional Mexican Albums chart. It also produced three top-twenty Regional Mexican Airplay tracks; "Enséñame", "Se Murió De Amor", and "La Rosa". The album earned Pulido a nomination for the Tejano Music Award for Male Entertainer of the Year and the Lo Nuestro Award for Regional Mexican New Artist of the Year. Pulido along with Mexican singer Graciela Beltrán, American urban quintets the Barrio Boyzz, Tejano musicians Emilio Navaira, Pete Astudillo, and Jennifer Peña recorded "Viviras Selena" for the 1997 soundtrack to the biopic film about Selena, who was called the Queen of Tejano music and was killed in March 1995. By 1997, Pulido was being credited for introducing Tejano music to a much younger audience in the U.S., among other Tejano novitiates.

In 1998, Pulido released his third studio album Llegaste a Mi Vida, which peaked at number two on the Regional Mexican Albums chart and at number eleven on the Top Latin Albums chart. The only single to appear on the Latin singles chart, "Pedire", peaked at number 28 on the Hot Latin Tracks chart. Pulido's album won five of twelve nominations at the 1998 Tejano Music Awards; winning Male Vocalist of the Year, Male Entertainer of the Year, Tejano Crossover Song of the Year for "¿Dónde Estás?", and Tejano Album of the Year. The same year, Desvelado and Llegaste a Mi Vida, each sold 100,000 units in Mexico—an unprecedented milestone for the singer. In September 1998, Pulido released his first live album En Vivo: Desde Monterrey Mexico, which was recorded on April 24, 1998, The album became the singer's fourth top-ten U.S. recording and peaked at number 21 on the Top Latin Albums chart. in a sold-out concert at the Auditorio Coca-Cola in Monterrey, becoming the first Tejano grupo musician to do so. In March 1999, he released his fourth studio album El Cazador, which produced the top-thirty Regional Mexican Airplay single "Cantarle a Ella". Pulido became the youngest recipient to be awarded the Orgullo de la Frontera from the Fiestas Mexicanas in February 1999. In an April 1999 interview, Pulido expressed interest in recording a Latin pop album and said he was not interested in crossing over and recording English-language albums.

2000–09: Decline in popularity, acting debut, and hiatus 
By 2000, Tejano music's dwindling popularity was thought to have recovered but it failed to do so; music critics believed veteran Tejano artists such as Emilio Navaira, Selena, Mazz, Michael Salgado, and Pulido dominated the airwaves in the U.S. and that old-school singers were not able to compete. That year, Pulido became a teen idol among Mexican American teenage girls and one of the most influential Tejano recording artists to the same demographic. In March 2000, he released Zona de Peligro, which was less successful than his previous albums, peaking at number 48 on the Top Latin Albums chart. None of its singles were commercially successful, but Pulido won the Tejano Music Award for Male Entertainer of the Year—his third consecutive win. According to musicologist Guadalupe San Miguel, Tejano musicians beginning in the late 20th century and into the early 21st century were indistinguishable from each other. Pulido released his sixth studio album Siempre Pensando En Ti in March 2001; it fared less well commercially, peaking at number 50 on the Top Latin Albums chart. The album became Pulido's last recording to impact a music chart on Billboard. In 2002, Pulido organized the Celebrity Golf Classic, a benefit charity that raised US$50,000 for the Easter Seals program. McAllen mayor Leo Montalvo announced at the event that November 2, 2002, would be "Bobby Pulido Day".

That June, Pulido released an eponymous album titled Bobby, which spawned the top 40 U.S. single "Vanidosa" that failed to appear on any music chart and was his final single. He recorded a cover version of Mexican singer Juan Gabriel's 1999 single "Se Me Olvidó Otra Vez", which was included on Bobby. His next albums, Montame (2003) and Vive (2005), failed to chart, ending his eight-year presence on Billboard. In 2003, Pulido made his acting debut in the telenovela television movie La Decada Furiosa, in which he played himself. Two years later, he appeared as a guest on the reality television show Big Brother México. Pulido performed and recorded "Ya Ves" for the live televised tribute concert Selena ¡VIVE! in April 2005. His next album, Enfermo de Amor, was released in August 2007. AllMusic editor Evan Gutierrez complimented Pulido's use of mixing genres without "[pushing] the envelope very far", and said the album "sound[s] fresh rather than repetitive". He called the title track "waltzing", "Una Más" a roots rock recording, and "Desvelado Acústico" a "sophisticated acoustic" Latin pop track. However, Gutierrez said the album was lacking and its production quality was "not quite top-notch". After the album's release, Pulido guest-starred in three episodes of the telenovela series Fuego en La Sangre as himself.

2010–present: Return to music and acting 

Pulido returned to recording music in 2010 and released Dias de Ayer in March that year. The album earned Pulido a nomination for the Tejano Music Award for Male Vocalist of the Year; the first time since 2003. Two years later, he released Lo Mio, his first album on Apodaca Records. In 2013, Pulido recorded  with former Aventura vocalist Henry Santos on Santos' song "No Sé Vivir Sin Tí". The same year, Pulido returned to acting and guest-starred as himself in two episodes of the telenovela Noches Con Platanito (2013–15). In 2014, he landed a regular, minor role as himself in the telenovela Qué pobres tan ricos. In November 2015, Pulido released "No Es Como Tú", a track from his twelfth studio album, Hoy. The album is Pulido's first as sole songwriter for any of his albums. Pulido told Mexican newspaper Publimentero that Hoy will be released as a strategic plan to "help fight the war" on physical music consumption; he is against the digital age of downloading and music streaming in the popular market. The album was expected to be released only through Pulido's social networking sites to combat piracy. In a May 2016 concert, Pulido performed "Si No Te Hubiera Conocido", a song he recorded with Miguel Luna that was shelved and forgotten during his career.

Personal life 
Pulido married Eliza Anzaldua in July 1996. They had three sons; Remy Pulido (born 1996), Darian Pulido (born 1998), and Trey Pulido (born 2005). However, Pulido filed for divorce in September 2013, after 17 years of being married and four months of separation. He married Mariana Morales in November 2018 and his fourth son Rodrigo Pulido was born December 2019.He currently resides in Miami, Florida and enjoys working out, eating healthily, and playing golf; his favorite pastime is playing guitar and he finds composing songs therapeutic.

During his musical career, Pulido's fans questioned his sexuality; he said he is not homosexual but rumors that he had slept with men continue to circulate. Pulido spoke to a Mexican television news program in 2013, and told viewers he is straight and that he has gay fans, which he said did not concern him. In April 2010, media outlets questioned Pulido after he released a music video in which he plays a stereotypical gay male; the singer said he wanted to "try something different [in his music videos]" and defended his gay followers, saying he has nothing against the LGBT community. After Puerto Rican pop singer Ricky Martin publicly announced his homosexuality, Pulido defended Martin's choice, saying "he is living his dreams".

Pulido has been an outspoken opponent of Republican president of the United States, Donald Trump. On his Instagram account, Pulido uploaded a picture of himself "urinating" on Trump's star on the Hollywood Walk of Fame.

Discography 

 Desvelado (1995)
 Enséñame (1996)
 Llegaste A Mi Vida (1997)
 El Cazador (1999)
 Zona de Peligro (2000)
 Siempre Pensando En Ti (2001)
 Bobby (2002)
 Móntame (2003)
 Vive (2005)
 Enfermo De Amor (2007)
 Dias De Ayer (2010)
 Lo Mio  (2012)
 Hoy (2016)

Filmography

See also 

 Music of Texas
 List of Hispanic and Latino Americans

References

Notes 

 - Read online, registration required

External links 
 
 
 

American Latin pop singers
American ranchera singers
Latin music songwriters
Spanish-language singers of the United States
1973 births
Living people
American male actors of Mexican descent
American male film actors
American mariachi musicians
American musicians of Mexican descent
American philanthropists
American male television actors
Cumbia musicians
Polka musicians
Tejano musicians
Male actors from Texas
Singers from Texas
Songwriters from Texas
Capitol Records artists
EMI Latin artists
Musicians from Miami
People from Edinburg, Texas
St. Mary's University, Texas alumni
20th-century American male actors
20th-century American singers
21st-century American male actors
21st-century American singers
Hispanic and Latino American musicians
Latin Grammy Award winners